is a railway station located in Yatsushiro, Kumamoto, Japan, operated by Kyushu Railway Company (JR Kyushu) and Hisatsu Orange Railway. The station opened on November 21, 1896.

Lines
Kyushu Railway Company
Kagoshima Main Line
Hisatsu Line
Hisatsu Orange Railway
Hisatsu Orange Railway Line

Platforms

Adjacent stations

See also
 List of railway stations in Japan

External links

  
 Hisatsu Orange Railway website 

Railway stations in Kumamoto Prefecture
Railway stations in Japan opened in 1896
Stations of Hisatsu Orange Railway